Amber Bellringer (born 5 June 1990 in Taranaki, New Zealand) is a New Zealand netball player. Bellringer played in the National Bank Cup for the Western Flyers in 2006 and 2007. With the start of the ANZ Championship, she played for the Central Pulse in the 2008 season, but was not signed for the 2009 season and in 2011 got signed back by the Central Pulse

References
2008 Central Pulse team profiles. Retrieved 13 May 2008.
2008 ANZ Championship profile. Retrieved 12 April 2009.

New Zealand netball players
Central Pulse players
People from Taranaki
Living people
1990 births
ANZ Championship players
Western Flyers players